Uniflow may refer to:

 UniFlow (Fire Show and Circus Performance Show Group)
 Uniflow diesel engine
 Uniflow steam engine
 UniFLOW Output Manager (Printing software)